The Idaho Springs Downtown Commercial District includes Early Commercial architecture in Idaho Springs, Colorado. The historic district was listed on the National Register of Historic Places in 1984.
 
The district is roughly bounded by Center Alley, 14th Ave., Riverside Dr., and Idaho St. in Idaho Springs.

References

National Register of Historic Places in Clear Creek County, Colorado
Historic districts on the National Register of Historic Places in Colorado
Early Commercial architecture in the United States
Buildings and structures completed in 1877
1877 establishments in Colorado